Ellie Scotney is an English professional boxer. As an amateur, she won the 2017 ABA Championships and competed at the 2018 World Championships.

Professional career
In February 2020, it was announced that Scotney had signed a long-term promotional contract with Eddie Hearn's Matchroom Sport. Her debut was scheduled for 28 March at The O2 Arena, London, and was to be televised live on Sky Sports in the UK and streamed on DAZN in the US, as part of the undercard for Josh Kelly vs. David Avanesyan. After the event was cancelled due to the COVID-19 pandemic, Scotney made her debut on 17 October against Bec Connolly. Scotney scored a knockdown in the third round en route to a six-round points decision (PTS) victory, with referee Michael Alexander scoring the bout 60–53.

Her second fight was on the undercard of Lawrence Okolie vs. Krzysztof Głowacki at The SSE Arena in London. She defeated Mailys Gangloff PTS over six rounds, with referee Marcus McDonnell scoring the bout 59–55.

Professional boxing record

References

Living people
Date of birth missing (living people)
Year of birth missing (living people)
English women boxers
Boxers from Greater London
Featherweight boxers